State Route 193 (SR 193) is part of Maine's system of numbered state highways.  It runs  from an intersection at U.S. Route 1 (US 1) in Cherryfield to rural East Hancock, Hancock County at State Route 9 near Beddington. SR 193 originally ran between East Eddington and East Holden.  The original route was renumbered SR 175, and 193 was moved to its current location.  The new route originally ran closer to Beddington Lake, but the road was not suitable for heavy traffic, and a new connector to its current terminus was built in 1956. The northern terminus is just south of Lead Mountain.

Major junctions

References

External links

Floodgap Roadgap's RoadsAroundME: Maine State Route 193

193
Transportation in Washington County, Maine
Transportation in Hancock County, Maine